Illusion's Play is funeral doom metal band Shape of Despair's third studio album.

Track listing
 "Sleep Mirrored (Instrumental)" – 6:09
 "Still-Motion" – 16:29
 "Entwined in Misery" – 8:03
 "Curse Life" – 9:18
 "Fragile Emptiness" – 8:56
 "Illusion's Play" – 12:36

All music & lyrics written in years '00-'02 by Jarno Salomaa.

Recording information
Engineered & mixed by Kaide Hinkkala & Antti Lindell
Mastered at Finnvox Studios by Mika Jussila

Credits

Shape of Despair
 Pasi Koskinen – vocals
 Natalie Koskinen – vocals
 Jarno Salomaa – guitars & synth
 Tomi Ullgren – guitars
 Sami Uusitalo – bass
 Samu Ruotsalainen – drums

Guest musicians
 Toni Raehalme – violin
 Aslak Tolonen – kantele

References

2004 albums
Shape of Despair albums